John Rodney Hellawell (20 December 1943 – 14 February 2019) was an English professional footballer who played as an inside forward.

Early and personal life
Born in Keighley, Hellawell attended St Bede's Grammar School. His older brother Mike was also a footballer, playing for England at international level.

Career
After playing for Salts, Hellawell made 68 appearances in the Football League for Bradford City, Rotherham United, Darlington and Bradford Park Avenue. He later played non-league football with Bromsgrove Rovers.

Later life and death
He died on 14 February 2019, aged 75.

References

1943 births
2019 deaths
Sportspeople from Keighley
English footballers
Association football inside forwards
People educated at St. Bede's Grammar School
Salts F.C. players
Bradford City A.F.C. players
Rotherham United F.C. players
Darlington F.C. players
Bradford (Park Avenue) A.F.C. players
Bromsgrove Rovers F.C. players
English Football League players